KUNI (90.9 MHz) is a radio station owned and operated by the University of Northern Iowa in Cedar Falls.  It is one of two NPR outlets for Eastern Iowa; the other being WSUI in Iowa City. KUNI's transmitter is in Walker, Iowa, with its primary signal covering Cedar Falls, Waterloo, Cedar Rapids and Iowa City. KUNI's programming is simulcast on full-power satellites KUNY 91.5 FM and KRNI 1010 AM in Mason City. KUNI also has three low-power FM translators: K233AA (94.5 FM) in Davenport, K237GD (95.3 FM) in Iowa City, and K274AA (102.1 FM) in Eldridge.

Programming is mostly NPR news and talk, with some KUNI produced music programs in the evenings and on weekends. It is now a part of Iowa Public Radio, operating with the other two public radio station clusters at the University of Iowa and Iowa State University. It is the flagship of IPR's "News and Studio One" service, which combines NPR news and talk programming with an extension of the "Live from Studio One" AAA program that aired on KUNI for years before the creation of IPR.

Announcer Bob Dorr had been involved with the station since 1972, producing programs of classic rock and roll recordings and live concerts featuring Iowa talent. He is also a harmonica player and heads the blues band, The Blue Band; which was inducted into the Iowa Rock and Roll Hall of Fame in 2007. Dorr retired from full-time broadcasting in 2009 but plans to produce occasional shows in the future.

References

External links
Iowa Public Radio
Last version of KUNI's independent site

NPR member stations
UNI
University of Northern Iowa
Cedar Falls, Iowa